Kuzman Šapkarev Primary School (alternative spellings include Kuzman Shapkarev or Kuzman Šapkarev) is a state-owned primary school in the suburb of Dracevo, located 10 km south from the downtown of Skopje, capital of North Macedonia.

The school was established in 1971 (first opened the doors on January 1, 1972), when the older schools located in Dracevo, Rajko Zhinzifov Primary School and Kliment Ohridski Primary School, became too small for the rising number of students, mostly due to the newcomers in the suburb after the 1963 Skopje earthquake. Kuzman Šapkarev Primary School is located in a totally renovated (2006-2011) building, which offers all the necessary conditions for a modern and interactive teaching of the pupils. Facilities include a fully functional kitchen, sports hall and dentist office. As state's laws in North Macedonia proclaim, all the school classrooms and labs are fully furnished with computers, comfortable chairs and desks that allow normal and healthy development of children.

Kuzman Šapkarev Primary School bears the name of the prominent ethnographer, folklorist and textbook writer, Kuzman Shapkarev, from the late 19th and early 20th century. The date of his death, March 18, is celebrated as the school day with a ceremony and sport and cultural tournaments.

The students of the school regularly participate and achieve excellent results in the regional math competitions and quizzes, as well as national chemistry, history, Macedonian Language etc. competitions. In the preparations for these competitions, teachers from the subject teaching programmes, who try to build a friendly and cooperative relationship with the students, are especially active. Also, very active in promoting the school and achieving medals and trophies are the students participating in one of the many sport clubs, the most active are the ones from the handball and basketball school teams, since these are the most popular sports in the country.

A few years ago the school started a new tradition in choosing the laureate of the graduating class. Laureates from past years include:
Angela-Aleksandra Ivanovikj (2007)
Karolina Ilievska (2008)
Filip Simeski (2009)
Martin Bibovski (2010)
Jovana Sajkovska (2011)

References

Education in North Macedonia